Warsaw Main Railway Station was the name of two different railway stations in Warsaw, Poland, both now defunct.  A smaller terminus station with two platforms again named Warszawa Główna opened on March 14, 2021.
  The name was retained for historical reasons only, and the actual main station in Warsaw is Warszawa Centralna located about 1 km to the east. The reopened station now serves as terminus of Masovian, InterRegio, and intercity lines from the direction of Łódź.

History

The first idea of construction of a main Warsaw station, which would have been the nexus of all rail lines in the city, appeared in 1879.  In practical terms, with one standard gauge line and a few broad gauge railway lines terminating in Warsaw in the 19th century, creating a single 'main' station would have been far from a trivial proposition.  However, when Poland regained independence and the standard gauge was universally adopted, this project was revived.  In 1921, when works on the modernisation of the Warsaw railway hub started, it became clear that it was necessary to demolish the obsolete Vienna Station. This having been done, passenger traffic was taken over by a temporary station on Chmielna street, which opened in 1921. On 7 June 1927 the Soviet ambassador to Poland Pyotr Voykov was fatally shot by a White émigré at the station while meeting Arkady Rosengolts, the former ambassador from the USSR to the United Kingdom.

Construction

It was decided that after the demolition of the Vienna Station, a new station would be constructed. The works began in 1932, and the monumental complex was designed by architects Czesław Przybylski and Andrzej Pszenicki, while Wacław Żenczykowski was the structural engineer. The station was supposed to become the most important railway station of the Second Polish Republic and one of the most modern in contemporary Europe. The complex was to be furnished with most modern appliances, including electric heating.

The station building  was located along the Warsaw's main street, Aleje Jerozolimskie, between Marszałkowska and Emilii Plater streets  and the platforms were in a tunnel on the cross-city line.

The station was designed in the Modernist Style, with then popular Art deco elements. The architects intended for the station to be multi-functional; therefore plenty of space had been designed for various stores, entertainment, and restaurants. As construction continued in 1938, first passengers were able to use the partly completed Warsaw Main Rail Station. However, the building was never completed because of the outbreak of the Second World War.

World War II

A few weeks before the war, on June 6, 1939, the still unfinished station was partly destroyed in a fire which had been started by a team of reckless welding contractors. Initially many people believed that it had been an act of sabotage by German or Soviet agents.  During the course of fighting the fire, led personally by the minister of the interior Felicjan Sławoj-Składkowski, one fireman died and three were wounded.

In September 1939, the station was damaged during the Siege of Warsaw (1939). Later, German authorities made some improvements, e.g. construction of a new roof. The station, though still unfinished and partly destroyed,  remained operational. This lasted until the Warsaw Uprising when, as a result of battle, the damage to the station got significantly bigger. In January 1945 the Germans, soon before retreating from Warsaw, blew the remains up.

Postwar

After the war, a new Warszawa Główna station (actually a few adopted tracks of a former goods yard, as well as a temporary wooden building on Towarowa Street) took the mainline services over.   Since 1975 Warszawa Centralna railway station has been Warsaw's principal station, but some scheduled and special trains continued to use the Warsaw Main station until 1997.  The wooden building is still standing, though in a very poor condition, and houses a part of the Railway Museum. One of the platforms is home to a seasonal night market, where bars, restaurants and cafes offer food and drinks to Varsovians on Tuesday, Friday, Saturday and Sunday nights.

Construction of a replacement station on the site started in March 2018 and the first train from the re-opened station ran on March 14, 2021. It serves trains running to Łowicz, Sochaczew, Dobieszyn, Skierniewice and Łódź Fabryczna. The station will also act as a terminus for long-distance trains during the renovation of the cross-city line.

Train services
The station is served by the following service(s):

 Intercity services (IC) Łódź Fabryczna — Warszawa Główna
 Intercity services (IC) Bydgoszcz Główna — Warszawa Główna
 InterRegio services (IR) Łódź Fabryczna — Warszawa Glowna 
 InterRegio services (IR) Łódź Kaliska — Warszawa Glowna 
 InterRegio services (IR) Ostrów Wielkopolski — Łódź — Warszawa Główna
 InterRegio services (IR) Poznań Główny — Ostrów Wielkopolski — Łódź — Warszawa Główna
Regional services (ŁKA) Łódz - Warsaw

References

Bibliography

 Jerzy S. Majewski, Warszawa nieodbudowana. Lata trzydzieste, Warszawa, 2005, .

External links
 Plans of the station and phases of construction
 Warsaw firefighters trying to extinguish the fire,June 6, 1939
 Color photograph of the station, taken by an unknown German soldier in the early 1940s

Railway stations in Poland opened in 1938
Glowna
History of Warsaw
Second Polish Republic
Disused railway stations in Poland
Railway stations closed in 1997